Pseudochazara gilgitica is a species of butterfly in the family Nymphalidae. It is confined to the north-western Himalayas and the west of the Hindu Kush to the west of the Pamirs.

Flight period 
The species is univoltine and is on wing from July to August.

Food plants
Larvae feed on grasses.

External links
 Satyrinae of the Western Palearctic - Pseudochazara gilgitica

Pseudochazara
Butterflies described in 1926